Michel Nakouzi (born 5 May 1932) is a Lebanese wrestler. He competed in the men's Greco-Roman bantamweight at the 1960 Summer Olympics.

References

1932 births
Living people
Lebanese male sport wrestlers
Olympic wrestlers of Lebanon
Wrestlers at the 1960 Summer Olympics
Sportspeople from Beirut
20th-century Lebanese people